Teau-o-Tonga was a Cook Islands football club located in Rarotonga, Cook Islands. It played in Cook Islands Cup, the national knockout football competition, in 1998, which they won.

Titles
Cook Islands Cup: 1
1998

References

Football clubs in the Cook Islands